Alert or ALERT  may refer to:

 Alertness, the state of active attention by high sensory awareness.

Places
 Alert, Iran
 Alert, Indiana, U.S.
 Alert, North Carolina, U.S.
 Alert, Ohio, U.S.
 Alert, Nunavut, Canada
 Alert Airport
 Alert Bay, British Columbia, Canada
 Alert Channel, in Stromness Bay, South Georgia
 Alert Cove, in Stromness Bay, South Georgia

Ships
 CS Alert, the name of several cable-laying ships
 HMS Alert, the name of several ships of the British Royal Navy
Alert-class sloop
 SS Alert, a steamship that sank off Victoria, Australia in 1893
 USS Alert or USCGC Alert, the name of several ships of the US Navy or US Coast Guard
 Alert (sternwheeler 1865), a steamboat in Oregon, U.S.

Other uses
 Alert (bridge), in the card game of bridge
 Alert (gum), a caffeinated gum product
 Alert (interbank network), now STAR
 Alert (motorcycle), an English motorcycle 1903–1906
 "Alert" (song), by K. Michelle, 2017
 Alert dialog box, in graphical user interfaces
 Alert messaging, machine-to-person communications such as reminders and notifications
 Alert Records, a Canadian record label
 Alert state, an indication of the state of readiness of the armed forces or a state
 ALERT (medical facility), in Ethiopia
 Alert: Missing Persons Unit, an American television drama series on Fox
 Alberta Law Enforcement Response Teams, an umbrella government agency in Canada
 Arizona League to End Regional Trafficking, an interagency coalition in the U.S.

See also

Alerta, a city in Peru
Alerte (disambiguation)
Red Alert (disambiguation)